is a district located in Kumamoto Prefecture, Japan.

Following the March 23, 2010 Kumamoto merger the district consists of the single town of Misato. After the merger, the district has an estimated population of 11,164 and a density of 77.5 persons per square kilometer. The total area is 144.03 km2.

Towns and villages
Misato

Mergers
See Merger and dissolution of municipalities of Japan.
On November 1, 2004, the towns of Chūō and Tomochi merged to form the new town of Misato.
On January 15, 2005, the towns of Matsubase, Ogawa and Toyono merged with the towns of Misumi and Shiranuhi from Uto District to form the new city of Uki.
On October 6, 2008 the town of Tomiai was merged into the expanded city of Kumamoto.
On March 23, 2010 the town of Jōnan, along with the town of Ueki, from Kamoto District, was merged into the expanded city of Kumamoto.

References

External links
 Official Kumamoto Prefecture homepage

Districts in Kumamoto Prefecture